Jalen Camp (born July 10, 1998) is an American football wide receiver for the Houston Texans of the National Football League (NFL). He played college football at Georgia Tech.

College career 
Camp played college football at Georgia Tech under coaches Paul Johnson and Geoff Collins. He finished his career at Georgia Tech with 48 receptions for 808 yards and five touchdowns in 48 career games.

Professional career

Jacksonville Jaguars
Camp was selected by the Jacksonville Jaguars in the sixth round with the 209th overall pick in the 2021 NFL Draft. Camp signed his four-year rookie contract with Jacksonville on May 17. He was waived on August 31, 2021.

Houston Texans
On September 3, 2021, Camp was signed to the Houston Texans practice squad. On December 26, 2021, Camp made his NFL debut in the Texans' week 16 game against the Los Angeles Chargers. He signed a reserve/future contract with the Texans on January 11, 2022.

On August 30, 2022, Camp was waived by the Texans and signed to the practice squad the next day. He was elevated to the active roster on October 29 ahead of a matchup with the Tennessee Titans. He signed a reserve/future contract on January 12, 2023.

References

Living people
Georgia Tech Yellow Jackets football players
Houston Texans players
Jacksonville Jaguars players
People from Cumming, Georgia
Players of American football from Georgia (U.S. state)
Sportspeople from the Atlanta metropolitan area
1998 births
American football wide receivers